Willesden TMD is a railway locomotive and electric multiple unit traction maintenance depot, situated in Harlesden, north London. The depot is situated next to the West Coast Main Line, to the south-east of Willesden Junction station and on the way into London Euston station. The depot code is WN.

History
The original locomotive servicing facility at Willesden was on the south side of the main line, west of the station, which closed in 1965. It was replaced by the present facility.

Shed layout
The current depot was designed in the 1960s to service electric locomotive classes AL1 to AL6 (TOPS classes 81, 82, 83, 84, 85 and 86); subsequently, in the early 1970s, Class 87s were included. It consists of six parallel shed roads, each holding four locomotives inside the shed, and several arrivals and departure sidings externally. There is also a road that runs round to the north of the shed, which provides access to the fuel siding; for many years, this was used only for the occasional fuelling of diesel shunters and also to the DC lines of Willesden Junction Low Level station, which is used to move multiple units from the shed onto the North London Line after servicing. 

The arrival and departure sidings contain two connections to the West Coast main line onto the up slow line. At the east end of the depot, there is a trailing crossover to permit access onto the down slow line when coming off depot.

Facilities

These include offices, a workshop and reasonably large stores. The workshop contains high quality facilities for pantograph overhaul, tap-changer overhaul and brake equipment test and servicing.

In more recent years, especially since the loss of AC electric locomotives, the fuel siding was promoted to other train operators as a facility at Willesden and a means to generate some revenue, this meant for instance that Gospel Oak to Barking Line DMUs did not need to travel to Bletchley TMD and back each night for 'A' examinations and fuelling which could instead be carried out at Willesden.

Allocation
Class 09
Class 378
Class 710

Previously allocated classes
Class 82
Class 83
Class 86
Class 87

See also
List of British Railways shed codes

References

Railway depots in London
Buildings and structures in the London Borough of Brent
Willesden